Lisa Borowski is a Democratic member of the Pennsylvania House of Representatives, representing the 168th District since 2023.

Borowski is a graduate of Radnor High School (1984) and Drexel University (1989). She worked as a healthcare communications professional for Mercy Health System and Einstein Healthcare Network, and also served as Board Operations Manager for the Philadelphia Police Foundation.

As an elected official, she served as a Radnor Township commissioner (2018-2022) and school board member (2011-2015). On November 8, 2022, she unseated Republican incumbent Christopher B. Quinn to represent the 168th House district, with 17,485 votes to Quinn's 13,708.

References

External links 
personal Facebook page
Borowski entry on ballotpedia.org

People from Radnor Township, Pennsylvania
Democratic Party members of the Pennsylvania House of Representatives
Women state legislators in Pennsylvania
School board members in Pennsylvania
Year of birth missing (living people)
Living people